Beatshapers Ltd. is a Ukrainian video game developer based in Kyiv.

Games developed/Own IP
 MelodyBloxx (PS minis, cancelled)
 BreakQuest: Extra Evolution (PSP and PS Vita)
 StarDrone Extreme (PS Vita)
 Z-Run (PS Vita)
 Ready to Run (PS4)
 #killallzombies (PS4 and Nintendo Switch)
 RC Soccer (iOS, Android, VR)
 StarDrone VR (PSVR)

Games ported

PlayStation Minis
 BreakQuest NormalTanks Carnivores: Dinosaur Hunter Enigmo Jane's Hotel Best of Solitaire (for Cosmigo GmbH)
 Carnivores: Ice Age Galcon Labs Canabalt Wizorb Jetpack JoyridePlayStation Network
 StarDrone 
 Snowy: Treasure Hunter (for Alawar)
PlayStation Vita
 StarDrone Extreme Furmins (with Housemarque)
 Mission ISS Gear VR (with Oculus/TMUG/Magnopus)

Games published
PlayStation MinisBreakQuest (PSP minis launch title)
 NormalTanks Carnivores: Dinosaur Hunter Jane's Hotel Enigmo Carnivores: Ice Age Galcon Labs Canabalt Wizorb BreakQuest: Extra Evolution Jetpack JoyridePlayStation Network
 StarDrone (PS3 - PS Move launch title)
 StarDrone Extreme (PS Vita launch title)
 BreakQuest: Extra Evolution Freemium and PRO edition (PS Vita)
 Furmins (PS Vita)
 Z-Run (PS Vita)
 #killallzombies (PS4)
 RC Soccer (Apple ARkit, Android Razer Phone exclusive)
 StarDrone VR (PlayStation VR)

Awards
FinalistStarDrone, IndieCade Festival 2011
Honorable MentionMelodyBloxx, IGF Mobile 2010
Developer Dash 2007
PlayFirst's Developer Dash Award 2007
Semi-FinalistRC Soccer VR, Global VR Challenge 2016 (China)
NomineeStarDrone VR'', IMGA Awards 2017

References

Sources

 PushSquare interview and Carnivores sequel teaser
 An interview with Beatshapers CEO at PSP Minis
 PlayFirst Developer Dash official press release
 BreakQuest reviews including paper magazines references
 Interview with Beatshapers CEO at PlayStation LifeStyle
 Independent Games Festival Mobile 2010 finalists and honorable mentions
 StartGame interview
 StarDrone official announcement
 Enigmo PlayStation minis announcement
 IndieCade Festival 2011 finalists
 Ready to Run announce on EU PSN blog
 StarDrone VR IMGA 2017 nominee
 StarDrone VR release announce
 Official website

Video game development companies
Video game publishers
Video game companies of Ukraine
Companies based in Kyiv
Video game companies established in 2006
Ukrainian companies established in 2006